The Thailand women's national water polo team represents Thailand in international women's water polo. The team won the gold medal at the Southeast Asian Games in 2015, 2017 and 2019. The team competed in their first World Championship in 2022 where they finished bottom of their group. The team made their debut at the Asian Games in 2018.

Results

World Aquatics Championships

Asian Games

Southeast Asian Games

Asian Water Polo Championship

References

Water polo
Thailand
Thailand
Thailand